Frodsham is a civil parish in Cheshire West and Chester, England.  It contains 62 buildings that are recorded in the National Heritage List for England as designated listed buildings.  Of these, one is listed at Grade I, the highest grade, another one is listed at Grade II*, the middle grade, and the others are at Grade II.  The parish consists of the market town of Frodsham and surrounding countryside.  The River Weaver and the Weaver Navigation run through the northern part of the parish, and there are two associated listed structures.  The Warrington to Chester railway line runs in a north–south direction through the parish.  Frodsham railway station, and the Frodsham viaduct crossing the Weaver, are listed.  The oldest listed building, and the only one at Grade I is St Laurence's Church, which contains some Norman features.  The Grade II* building is the former vicarage, which was extended in the 19th century by John Douglas.  Most of the other listed buildings are houses and associated structures, shops, and cottages, some of which date back to the 16th and 17th centuries and are timber-framed.  The other listed structure include farmhouses, farm buildings, public houses, hotels, boundary stones, tide stones, a sundial, memorials, and telephone kiosks.  The newest listed building is a former anti-aircraft operations room that was built in about 1951.

Key

Buildings

See also

Listed buildings in Alvanley
Listed buildings in Aston-by-Sutton
Listed buildings in Helsby
Listed buildings in Kingsley
Listed buildings in Manley
Listed buildings in Runcorn (urban area)
Listed buildings in Sutton

References
Citations

Sources

 

 

Listed buildings in Cheshire West and Chester
Lists of listed buildings in Cheshire
Listed buildings